This is a list of notable car magazines.

Current

Asia

India 

 Overdrive

Japan 

 Option, 1981
 Drift Tengoku, 1999

Australia 

 The Dog & Lemon Guide, a car buyer's guide originally based in New Zealand, since 2010 online only
 Motor, founded in Australia in 1954 as Modern Motor, renamed Motor in 1992
 NZ Classic Car, first issued in 1990
 NZ Hot Rod Magazine, first issued in 1967
 NZ Performance Car, first published in 1996
 NZV8 magazine, launched in 2005
 Top Gear Australia, published by the Bauer Media Group with a partnership with the BBC. Last issue October 2015
 Wheels, first issued in Australia in 1953

Europe

British 

 Auto Express, first issued in 1988
 Auto Italia, started in 1995 focussing on Italian marques, manufacturers and designers.
 Autocar, first issued 1895, considered the first car magazine
 Autosport, first issued in 1950, mainly concentrating on motor sport
 Car, established in 1962 as Small Car, renamed Car in 1965
 Car Mechanics, published since 1958
 Classic & Sports Car, first issued in 1982
 Classic Car Weekly, weekly magazine published since 1990
 Evo, first issued 1998
 Fast Car, first issued 1987, covering modified cars
 Octane, first issued in 2003
 Parker's Car Price Guide, founded in 1972
 Performance BMW, launched in 2001
 Practical Classics, published since 1980
 Practical Performance Car
 Top Gear, first issued in 1993; related to the BBC TV programme Top Gear
 Total 911, launched in 2005; focuses on the Porsche 911
 VolksWorld, published since 1987; specialising in Volkswagen cars
 What Car?, first issued in 1973

Italy 
 Al Volante, first issued in 1999.
 Quattroruote, first issued in 1956.
 Ruoteclassiche, first issued in 1987; focuses on classic and vintage cars.
 L'Auto Italiana, first issued in 1919; since 1957 focuses on cars from Quattroruote's collection.

North America 

 Automobile, first issue 1986
 Automotive Industries, founded in 1895 as The Horseless Age, becoming The Automobile in 1909, then Automotive Industries in 1917
 Autoweek, first issued in 1958
 Car and Driver, first issued in 1955 as Sports Cars Illustrated, renamed in 1961
 Car Craft, established in 1953 focussing on hod rods and drag racing
 Cruisin' Style Magazine
 Diesel Power, first published in 2005
 European Cars
 Green Car Journal, published quarterly since 1992
 Hot Rod Magazine
 Motor Trend, first published in 1949
 Road & Track, first published in 1947

South America

Brazil 
 Quatro Rodas

Defunct

Brazil

 0 Km
 Automóveis Antigos
 Automóvel & Requinte
 Carro
 Motor 3 (1980-1987)
 Mecânica Popular
 Oficina Mecânica
 Old Cars
 Platina (1994-1995)
 Revista Racing
 Super Auto
 Status Motor

British 

 Auto Trader, print magazine published between 1975 and 2013, now online only
 Automotor and Horseless Vehicle Journal, first issued in October 1896
 Fast Lane (1984-1994)
 iCar, only published two issues in 2011
 Iota, about 500cc motor racing
 Max Power, first issued in 1993, ceased publication in 2011; covered modified cars
 Motor, first issued in 1903 as The Motor; ceased publication in 1988 after it was bought by Autocar
 Motor Racing
 Motor World, known as "Scotland's Motor Journal". Established in 1899
 Performance Car, published 1983 to 1998, with a short-lived relaunch in 2008-09
 Popular Motoring, published from 1962 to 1982.
 Practical Motorist, published from 1934 to 1940, then 1954 to 1997.
 Speed, official organ of the British Racing Drivers' Club (1935-1939)

France
 L'automobile (1950's)
 La Locomotion Automobile, The first issue was published in December 1894.
 Omnia (1906-1936)

North American 

 Sports Cars Illustrated, launched in 1961, renamed Car and Driver in 1965
 Speed Age, published May 1947 to October 1959

References 

Cars